The Bourbonnais dialects are spoken in the historic region of Bourbonnais, located in central France and including the department of Allier the area surrounding Saint-Amand-Montrond, in southeastern Cher. This linguistic zone is located between those home to the languages of Oïl, Occitan, and Franco-Provençal.

Bourbonnais, an ambiguous term 

There are two indigenous languages in Bourbonnais:
 An Oïl language is spoken in two thirds of Allier, north of the line Montluçon (Occitan) – Saint-Pourçain-sur-Sioule (Oïl) – Lapalisse (Oïl), and in the Bourbonnais part of Cher. The dialect has its origins in the  Moulins, Allier area, Bourbon-l'Archambault, and Souvigny.
 Occitan languages are spoken south of Montluçon and near Gannat and Vichy. These are dialects of the Occitan langage of the Croissant (linguistic) in southern Bourbonnais and northern Limousin. They are on their way to be integrated into the French language. The scientific term for these idioms is Arverno-Bourbonnais, as they belong to the Auvergnat dialect linguistic zone, with a transition to the Oïl language.
 In the South-East, in the area of the Montagne Bourbonnaise, the local Occitan dialect is influenced by Franco-Provençal.

Thus "Bourbonnais" is an ambiguous term: it can refer to idioms of Occitan (Bourbonnais of Oc), or to French dialects of the Bourbonnais (Bourbonnais of Oïl).

Present state 

Bourbonnais dialects were submitted to a Parisian top-down approach, like all other regional languages in France. Besides, the presence of Oïl idioms in the North, which are close to Standard French or Francien (île-de-France dialect), makes it easier to have linguistic assimilation towards the South.

As the majority of dialects, Bourbonnais idioms are mostly spoken, and literary works are rare. However, there are some: one example is that of writer Louis Péroux Beaulaton (1872–1946), who was passionate about his Occitan Auvergnat dialect from the Montluçon suburbs. Nowadays only enthusiasts, as well as the older generation, can speak fluent Oïl and Occitan Bourbonnais dialects. Nevertheless, they haven't totally disappeared: they have been integrated into the French language, adding numerous phrases, expressions and vocabulary. Inhabitants of this region thus unconsciously speak French, but  shaded with Bourbonnais forms: this can be noticed by tourists.

Bourbonnais as an Oïl language

Pronunciation 

Examples of pronunciation (transcriptions are made according to the IPA):
 O pronounced as [u]: example Tonner= [tone](French)/ [tune] (Bourbonnais)
 Oi [w] is pronounced as [ue] or [ɛ]: example Noir= [nwaR](French)/ [nuer](Bourbonnais); Droit= [dRwa] (French)/ [dRɛ]
 er [eR] is pronounced as [aR]: example Merci= [meRsi] (French)/ [maRsi] (Bourbonnais)
 re is pronounced as er: example Bredin (look at word examples) would be pronounced as Berdin
 au[o] is pronounced as [jo]: example Couteau=[ kuto] (French)/ [kutjo] (Bourbonnais)
 -lier [lje] is pronounced as [je]: example Palier= [palje] (French)/ [paje] (Bourbonnais)
 [R] is rolled as local speakers do in Champagne
 -eur [œR] is pronounced as [ø]: example Meneur=[mənœR] (French)/ [mənø] (Bourbonnais)
 ch [ʃ] is pronounced as [ʒ]: example Cheval [ʃəval] (French)/[ʒval] (Bourbonnais)

Grammar 
The adverbial pronoun Y (there) is used as a personal pronoun representing an object. For example " fais-le "(do it) (French)/" fais-y "(Boubonnais); "donne-le/la moi "(give it to me) (French)/" donne-moi z'y; ne "(Bourbonnais);" ne le casse pas "(don't break it) (French)/" n'y casse pas "(Bourbonnais); "tu me le/la prêtes" (lend it me) (French)/ "tu m'y prêtes" (Bourbonnais) etc.

There is, in Bourbonnais, a form for neutral gender: the pronoun "al" can be used for masculine gender, as well as for feminine gender, for inanimate objects as for animated ones. Thus, both male and female dogs can be designated by "al", just as a member of a family or a neighbour. For example, the phrase "al a tout mange" ("al" ate it all) can be said about a dog but also about a neighbour.

Vocabulary

Some lexical examples

Expressions used in common French

Bourbonnais, Arverno-Bourbonnais, Occitan language (Croissant zone) 

In this part we will look at the Occitan variant of Bourbonnais (Arverno-Bourbonnais/Auvergnat dialect), spoken in the community of Busset canton Cusset. The words are given in united Auvergnat writing; transcription using the phonetic alphabet used for French is given between brackets.

Vocabulary

Texts

The first article of The Universal Declaration of Human Rights

L'Oïasse de Gayette 

Vé le bourg de Montoudre, su un teurau qu'y a des boés d'un coûta et des pra de Faute, forts-tarrains et fôrt-tarrines, veïez-vous l'hôpital de Gayette ? Ou é bin-n-aisant a vère dret-là : Ion que l'é, a semble un villadze. Ou é unhne retirance pre les vieux strôpiâs. Mais faudrun pas crère qu'ai é étâ bâti à l'esqueprê pre deveni unhne boéte à varmine. San unhne oïasse, a serun pas é pouvres. Ou essô un beau tsâquiau qu'unhne dame bin ritse habitô. Dans les vaissiyés, les sarvantes pouziant tous les dzours des pitsiés, des fourtsettes et des quilles en ardzent; la dame avô tzôzi les filles les pu hounêtes dou pays, et dzamais presoune les ère acorpées de voul. Unhne de ieux z'aute enlevô unhne oïasse qu'un cheti gâavô dégniâ dans les brantses dou tsâgne. Ion qu'où embredzô les maufesans. "Têh ! li avô dit cou gâ bin fûtâ, ou te pourterâ bounheûr." Et le li douni. La sarvante enleva que l'oïasse; li apprenô à causer. Le lendemain d'un apport, la dame avisa ce que l'avô d'ardzentriun; li manquô un quille. Le tretzi la gâte qu'avô randzâ les vaissiyés : ou essô mêmement la sarvante à l'oïasse. Le la fait empougner et le la questioune : Ta beau dire qu'où é pas se, le la condanhne et l'embredze au tsâgne des maufesans. Le disi, en mourant, la paure sarvante : "Vêla ce que m'a coûta mon oïasse que devô me pourter bounheûr !" Un an après, en réparant la couvârture dou tsâquiau, sou unhne tuile, le couvreû trouve le quille predu. A cou moument, Toïasse empourtô au même endrêt unhne pièce de mounaie que le venô de prendre. Le couvreû y dit à la dame qui agour se tsagrine : "Paure sarvante qu'i ai fait meuri !", que le disi. Deux anhnées pu tard, aile douni son tsâquiau et ses appartenances é pouvres de Varennes, de Montoudre, de Boucé, de Montaigu, de Rondzères, de Landzy, de Saint-Dzerand, de Crétsy, de Sanssat et des alentours. Velà ce que me disi Dzôzé, le vieu ancien meneû de loups qu'é mort y a mais de soixante ans, et que le monde cause inquère.

L'Agrôle et le Rena 

En 1850, le bétchio parlève inquère; v'la c'quo disève :

Un jou d'hivia, quou ne fasève pas trop biau,

L'agrôle ère juchade au bout d'un baliviau

L'ère su daut moutade,

Pa fère son dinâ que l'aye prépara.

Embéi un groua fromage vainhiu de Chambéra

Le rena dépeu treis jous que n'aye pas de pain,

Aussitôt s'appeurché en fasant le câlin.

Eh, bonjou note dame, coumant vous pourtez-vous ?

Hela ! qué sé contint de vous véire chia n'zote !

Et vous trouve si gente embé quo nail mantiau !

Présoune dé le boux n'en pourte un aussi biau !

Votés souliés sont faits d'iune piau qué tant fine,

Et creyes que le ré n'en a pas de parés pindus à sa souline.

Ar sé é vous écouti dire iune chansou

Et cregus, oui ma foué, quou ére le rossignou

Si zère chabretère, par avi voté jeu

E' doniau, é n'en jure, la méta de ma queue.

L'agrôle qu'ère enchantade de se veire vantade

Pa li douna l'aubade se meté à couana,

Son froumage dévalé dé la gueule do renâ,

Alle resté su-daut le bé bada.

Ma l'autre, li dissé, en migeant son fricot,

Ne si'a don pas si buse un autre co.

In films 

In the film "La soupe aux choux", some characters speak more or less Standard French mixed up with phrases, words and pronunciation of Oïl Bourbonnais.

See also 
 Linguistics
 Index of language articles
 List of language families
 Indo-European languages
 Romance languages
 Langues d'oïl
 Berrichon dialect
 Franco-Provençal language
 Occitano-Romance languages
 Occitan language
 Auvergnat dialect
 Croissant (linguistic)
 Dialectology

References

Bibliography 
 Investigation of the IFOP for the Auvergnat section of the Institut d'études occitanes, 2006.
 Jean Bernard and Jean Chardonnet, Lexique du parler bourbonnais. Le bocage bourbonnais, Charroux, Éd. des Cahiers bourbonnais.
 Marcel Bonin (1984) Dictionnaire général des patois bourbonnais, Moulins, printed in Pottier.
 Pierre Bonnaud (1992), Grammaire générale de l'auvergnat à l'usage des arvernisants, coll. Eubransa / Travaux, Chamalières, Cercle Terre d'Auvergne.
 Pierre Bonnaud, Nouveau dictionnaire général français-auvergnat, Nonette, Created, June 1999, 776 p. ( et 978-2909797328)
 J.L. Bourioux, Le parler de Busset, association "dà coutà d'vé Buss".
 Jean-Pierre Chambon et Philippe Olivier (2000), "L'histoire linguistique de l'Auvergne et du Velay: notes pour une synthèse provisoire", Travaux de linguistique et de philologie 38, pp. 83–153.
 Frantz Brunet, Dictionnaire du parler bourbonnais et des régions voisines, Paris, 1964; republished be De Borée, 1993.
 René Chicois, Le parler biachet et montluçonnais au milieu du XXe siècle, Charroux, Éd. des Cahiers bourbonnais.
 Wolfgang Dahmen (1985), Étude de la situation dialectale dans le Centre de la France : un exposé basé sur l'Atlas linguistique et ethnographique du Centre, Paris, CNRS.
 Simone Escoffier (1958) La rencontre de la langue d'oïl, de la langue d'oc et du franco-provençal entre Loire et Allier : limites phonétiques et morphologiques, coll. Publications de l'Institut de linguistique romane de Lyon, vol. 11, Paris, Les Belles Lettres
 Simone Escoffier (1958) Remarques sur le lexique d'une zone marginale aux confins de la langue d'oïl, de la langue d'oc et du francoprovençal, coll. Publications de l'Institut de linguistique romane de Lyon, vol. 12, Paris, Les Belles Lettres
 Michel Labonne, Alain Muller, Sylvie Vilatte, Mémoires du patois de Sologne bourbonnaise. Langage et société, Moulins, Société d'émulation du Bourbonnais (prix Achille-Allier, 2014).
 Louis Péroux-Beaulaton (1940), Les parlers populaires en le Centre de la France : pays de Combrailles, voisinages du Berry, du Limousin et de l'Auvergne, sn., Montluçon [1re éd. sd., vers 1907].
 Karl-Heinz Reichel, Études et Recherches sur les parlers arverno-bourbonnais aux confins de l'Auvergne, du Bourbonnais, de la Marche et du Forez, collection Eubransa/Travaux, Chamalières, Cercle Terre d'Auvergne, 2012
 Karl-Heinz Reichel, Grand dictionnaire général auvergnat-français, Nonette, Créer, 3 décembre 2005 ( et 2848190213)
 Jules Ronjat (1930–1941), Grammaire istorique [sic] des parlers provençaux modernes, 4 vol. [republished in 1980, Marseille, Laffitte Reprints, 2 vol.]
 Jean Roux, L'auvergnat de poche, Chennevières-sur-Marne (Val-de-Marne), Assimil, coll. "Assimil évasion", 2002 ( et 2700503198)

External links 
 A site dedicated to Bourbonnais http://micbourbonnais.free.fr/
 Babel Project Profile of the Diou dialect http://projetbabel.org/diou/index.htm
 Illustrated dictionary of Patois Bourbonnais http://patoisbourbonnais.blog.free.fr/

Oïl languages